Manhattan Latin (subtitled The Sensuous Rhythms of Spanish Harlem) is an album by American jazz vibraphonist Dave Pike which was recorded in 1964 for the Decca label. The album is among Chick Corea's earliest recordings

Reception

The Allmusic site awarded the album 4 stars stating "Manhattan Latin captures Dave Pike in flux between the straight-ahead approach of his earlier sessions and the psychedelic pop-jazz of his efforts for MPS: a playful yet methodical immersion into pure, sunkissed groove, its artful assimilation of global rhythms and textures anticipates the direction of Pike's most memorable work".

Track listing
All compositions by Dave Pike except as indicated
 "Baby" - 2:49
 "Que Mal Es Querer" (Arsenio Rodríguez) - 3:18
 "Not a Tear" (Rudy Stevenson) - 4:01
 "Mambo Dinero" - 2:39
 "Montuno Orita" - 3:23
 "Aphrodite" - 3:16
 "La Playa" - 3:06
 "Latin Blues" - 2:56
 "South Sea" (Stevenson) - 2:38
 "Sandunga" - 2:41
 "Dream Garden" - 3:25
 "Vikki" - 5:26

Personnel 
Dave Pike - vibraphone 
Dave Burns - trumpet
Ray Copeland - flugelhorn
Hubert Laws - piccolo, tenor saxophone (tracks 2, 3, 5 & 7)
Joseph Grimaldi - flute (tracks 4, 6, 8 & 9)
Chick Corea (tracks 1-3, 5, 7 & 10), Don Friedman (tracks 4, 6, 8 & 9) - piano
Attila Zoller - guitar (tracks 4, 6, 8 & 9)
Israel "Cachao" Lopez (tracks 1-3, 5, 7 & 10), Jack Six (tracks 4, 6, 8 & 9) - bass
Carlos "Patato" Valdes - congas
Bobby Thomas - percussion (tracks 2, 3, 5 & 7)
Willie Bobo - drums

References 

1964 albums
Dave Pike albums
Decca Records albums